Baldomer Lostau i Prats (1846–1896) was a Spanish politician.

He was involved in the proclamation of a Catalan Republic in 1873.

Notes 

Politicians from Catalonia
People from Barcelona
1846 births
1896 deaths
19th-century Spanish politicians
Cantonalism in Spain